Dilfirib Kadın ("deceitful heart";  1890 –  1952) was the fifth and last consort of Sultan Mehmed V of the Ottoman Empire.

Life
Dilfirib Kadın was born in 1890 at Istanbul. She was Circassian. She married Mehmed in 1907 as his fifth consort. She remained childless. On 27 April 1909, after Mehmed's accession to the throne, she was given the title of "Senior Ikbal". She was later elevated the title of "Fourth Kadın" when Dürriaden Kadın died on October 1909. Safiye Ünüvar, a teacher at the Palace School, who met her in 1915, described her being young and well educated. Safiye Ünüvar wrote that she was friends with her and that their friendship continued until her death.

On 30 May 1918, Dilfirib met with the Empress Zita of Bourbon-Parma in the harem of Yıldız Palace, when the latter visited Istanbul with her husband Emperor Charles I of Austria. With her beauty, she won the Empress's appreciation.

Dilfirib and Nazperver Kadın, Mehmed's fourth wife were with him, when he died on 3 July 1918. After the sultan's death, she remained in the Yıldız Palace. When the imperial family went into exile in 1924, she moved in her villa located in Erenköy and she remarried with a doctor, with she had a son. She died in 1952 because cancer.

See also
Kadın (title)
Ottoman Imperial Harem
List of consorts of the Ottoman sultans

References

Sources

 
 

1890s births
1952 deaths
20th-century consorts of Ottoman sultans
Royalty from Istanbul